"Ocean Drive" is a song written by British musical duo Lighthouse Family for their debut album of the same name (1995). Produced by Mike Peden, the song was released as the second single from the album on 2 October 1995 and reached the top 40 on the UK Singles Chart. The song was re-released, slightly remixed and with new vocals, on 20 May 1996 and reached the top 20 on the UK chart. This version also appeared on the duo's 2002 Greatest Hits album.

Background and writing
The song was written and composed by keyboard-player Paul Tucker and sung by Tunde Baiyewu.  

The trumpet solo is by Tim Kellett.

Critical reception
James Masterton for Dotmusic described "Ocean Drive" as "a lovely, mellow track that is no less brilliant than the first". A reviewer from Music Week rated the song three out of five, writing, "From this summer's happy British film hit Jack And Sarah comes a track of unconstrained quality." Later, the magazine added, "Mellow vibe with a Tracy Chapman feel to the vocal result in a record that you can imagine radio rightly embracing."

Track listings
 UK CD single (1995)
 "Ocean Drive" (7-inch)
 "Ocean Drive" (Linslee R&B mix)
 "Ocean Drive" (Rokstone dub mix)
 "Ocean Drive" (Tactica mix)

 UK cassette single (1995)
 "Ocean Drive" (7-inch)
 "Ocean Drive" (Linslee 7-inch R&B mix)

 UK CD single (1996)
 "Ocean Drive" (7-inch radio mix)
 "Ocean Drive" (Linslee R&B mix)
 "Ocean Drive" (Linslee '96 mix)
 "Lifted" (acoustic version)

 UK cassette single (1996)
 "Ocean Drive" (7-inch radio mix)
 "Ocean Drive" (Linslee R&B mix)
 "Ocean Drive" (Linslee '96 mix)

Charts and certifications

Original release

Re-release

Certifications

Release history

References
]

1993 songs
1995 singles
1996 singles
Lighthouse Family songs
Polydor Records singles
Songs written by Paul Tucker (musician)